Max Friedrich Ferdinand Rabes (17 April 1868, Szamotuły – 25 July 1944, Vienna) was a German Impressionist painter. Although he is best remembered as an Orientalist painter, he rejected that label during his lifetime and wanted all of his works to be equally recognized.

Biography
Following several moves, his family settled in Berlin in 1876. He was initially self taught, through making nature studies and sketches. Later, he took lessons from the landscape painter, Paul Graeb (1842–1892). Following Graeb's advice, he entered into an apprenticeship with the decorative painter, .

He made numerous trips to North Africa and the Middle East. In 1898, on the recommendation of Oswald von Richthofen, the Foreign Secretary, he was invited to accompany Kaiser Wilhelm II on a trip to Istanbul and Palestine. Many years later, he would travel to America with Prince Cyril of Bulgaria.

He was appointed an honorary doctor and became a Professor at the Berlin University of the Arts. In 1899, he was awarded the Order of the Zähringer Lion.

In 1914, he undertook a trip to the front lines in East Prussia. The following year, he was at the western front in Belgium and, in 1917, visited Verdun. In between these trips, he maintained  a residence in Berlin-Charlottenburg.

In addition to his canvases, he did decorative work; including landscape murals at a castle in Lausitz (1901) and a villa in Iserlohn (1905), as well as ceiling paintings and allegorical murals at the Schauspielhaus in what is now Wrocław (1906–1908).

Selected paintings

References

Further reading 
 Rabes, Max in: Meyers Großes Konversationslexikon, 1905, Vol.16, pg.539.
 Richard Braungart (Ed.): "Max Rabes: Kunst der Zeit." In the series: Monographien zeitgenössischer Malerei und Plastik. Verlag Oechelhäuser, 1928.
 Maximilian Rapsilber: Max Rabes. Ein Lebens- und Welt-Bild. Verlag Gustav Braunbeck, Berlin 1918.
 Karin Rhein: Deutsche Orientmalerei in der zweiten Hälfte des 19. Jahrhunderts. Entwicklung und Charakteristika. Tenea Verlag für Medien, Berlin 2003

External links 

 More works by Rabes @ ArtNet
 Artwork by Max Friedrich Ferdinand Rabes

1868 births
1944 deaths
19th-century German painters
19th-century German male artists
German Impressionist painters
German orientalists
German landscape painters
Artists from Poznań
20th-century German painters
20th-century German male artists